Asaccus nasrullahi, Nasrullah's leaf-toed gecko, is a species of gecko in the family Phyllodactylidae. The species is endemic to Iran. The specific name nasrullahi was chosen in honor of Iranian herpetologist Nasrullah Rastegar-Pouyani, "in recognition of his contribution to the knowledge of the herpetology of Iran, including the genus Asaccus".

Taxonomy
A. nasrullahi was previously misidentified as Ptyodactylus hasselquistii, until it was named as a new species in 2006. The name nasrullah also means "victory of God" which according to the author "seems appropriate for the survival, discovery and rediscovery of this gecko species".

Geographic range and habitat
A. nasrullahi is found in the Zagros Mountains in rocky valleys dominated by oaks such as Quercus brantii.

References

Asaccus
Reptiles of Iran
Endemic fauna of Iran
Reptiles described in 2006
Taxa named by Yehudah L. Werner